

QI04A Sheep

QI04AA Inactivated viral vaccines
QI04AA01 Louping ill virus
QI04AA02 Bluetongue virus

QI04AB Inactivated bacterial vaccines (including mycoplasma, toxoid and chlamydia)
QI04AB01 Clostridium
QI04AB02 Pasteurella
QI04AB03 Bacteroides
QI04AB04 Escherichia
QI04AB05 Clostridium + pasteurella
QI04AB06 Chlamydia
QI04AB08 Erysipelothrix
QI04AB09 Mycobacterium
QI04AB10 Staphylococcus

QI04AC Inactivated bacterial vaccines and antisera
Empty group

QI04AD Live viral vaccines
QI04AD01 Orf virus/contagious pustular dermatitis

QI04AE Live bacterial vaccines
QI04AE01 Chlamydia
QI04AE02 Listeria
QI04AE03 Mycobacterium

QI04AF Live bacterial and viral vaccines
Empty group

QI04AG Live and inactivated bacterial vaccines
Empty group

QI04AH Live and inactivated viral vaccines
Empty group

QI04AI Live viral and inactivated bacterial vaccines
Empty group

QI04AJ Live and inactivated viral and bacterial vaccines
Empty group

QI04AK Inactivated viral and live bacterial vaccines
Empty group

QI04AL Inactivated viral and inactivated bacterial vaccines
Empty group

QI04AM Antisera, immunoglobulin preparations, and antitoxins
QI04AM01 Pasteurella antiserum
QI04AM02 Clostridium antiserum

QI04AN Live parasitic vaccines
QI04AN01 Toxoplasma

QI04AO Inactivated parasitic vaccines
Empty group

QI04AP Live fungal vaccines
Empty group

QI04AQ Inactivated fungal vaccines
Empty group

QI04AR In vivo diagnostic preparations
Empty group

QI04AS Allergens
Empty group

QI04AT Colostrum preparations and substitutes
Empty group

QI04AU Other live vaccines
Empty group

QI04AV Other inactivated vaccines
Empty group

QI04AX Other immunologicals
Empty group

QI04X Ovidae, others
Empty group

Notes

References

I04